ATSB may refer to:

 Australian Transport Safety Bureau, a federal government body in Australia, investigates air, sea accidents etc. 
 Arbeiter-Turn- und Sportbund, a former worker's sports federation in Germany
 Astronautic Technology Sdn Bhd, a Malaysian research organization
 Air Transportation Stabilization Board, a United States government department, concerned with financial stability within the air industry 
 Attractive toxic sugar baits, an insecticide for mosquitos